Colonel George Augustine Washington (1815 – December 4, 1892) was an American tobacco planter, slaveholder, company director and politician. He was "one of the world's largest tobacco growers" by 1860, and served in the Tennessee General Assembly in the 1870s.

Early life
George Augustine Washington was born in 1815. His father, Joseph Washington, was from Virginia. His mother was Mary Cheatham. Washington built Wessyngton, a tobacco plantation in Cedar Hill, Tennessee.

Career
Washington inherited the Wessyngton plantation in 1848, with slaves. In addition to producing tobacco as a commodity crop, the plantation also raised pigs and sold ham and related pork products. By 1860, Washington was "one of the world's largest tobacco growers," and the owner of 274 slaves. During the American Civil War of 1861–1865, he lived in New York City.

Washington served on the boards of directors of the Louisville and Nashville Railroad and the Nashville and Chattanooga Railroad. He also served as a member of the Tennessee General Assembly from 1873 to 1875.

Death
Washington was married twice. He died on December 4, 1892, in Cedar Hill, Tennessee. His son Joseph E. Washington continued to manage the plantation, and served as a United States Congressman from Tennessee from 1887 to 1897.

References

1815 births
1892 deaths
People from Robertson County, Tennessee
American planters
American corporate directors
Members of the Tennessee General Assembly
American slave owners
Tobacco industry
19th-century American politicians
19th-century American businesspeople